(October 25, 1873 – November 7, 1916)
was a popular rōkyoku recitalist in Meiji Japan. His immense popularity helped rōkyoku break into the mainstream.  At his height, he performed Chūshingura productions to sell-out crowds at some of the biggest theatres in Tokyo and Osaka. These performances also roused nationalist sentiment during Russo-Japanese War.

Tōchūken's style of reciting left a lasting impression on rōkyoku, and indirectly also on enka, especially the music of Haruo Minami and Hideo Murata. Tōchūken was a contemporary of legendary musician-activist Soeda Azenbō.

Mikio Naruse made a biopic about him in 1936.

See also
 Music of Japan

 Yoshida Naramaru

References

1873 births
1916 deaths
19th-century Japanese musicians
People of Meiji-period Japan
20th-century Japanese musicians
Musicians from Gunma Prefecture
People from Gunma Prefecture
20th-century Japanese male musicians
19th-century Japanese male musicians